Prods Oktor Skjaervo is Emeritus Professor of Iranian Studies in the Department of Near Eastern Languages and Civilizations at Harvard University, where he succeeded Richard Frye as Aga Khan Professor of Iranian Studies.

Born in Steinkjer, Norway, Skjaervo is a hyperpolyglot, familiar with historical and living languages including Old Norse, Norwegian, English, French, German, Italian, Spanish, Russian, Latin, Larestani, Kumzari, Bashkardi, Pashto, Yidgha, Yaghnobi, Munji, Old Khotanese, Avestan, Old Persian, Pahlavi, Manichean Middle Persian, Parthian, Sogdian, Khotanese, New Persian, Ossetic, Kurdish, Tokharian, Vedic, and Classical Sanskrit.

Education
In 1963 Skjaervo matriculated at the University of Oslo where he studied French, Latin, and Sanskrit, with a semester in 1965 at the Sorbonne in Paris.  He earned his B.A. (candidatus magisterii) in 1970.  In 1974 he completed his M.A. with the thesis, Undersøkelser til verbalsystemet i gammelpersisk og vestlig middeliransk (Investigations into the verbal systems of Old Persian and Western Middle Iranian), on which he subsequently based his “Remarks on the Old Persian Verbal System.”  He then completed his Ph.D. in 1981 from the University of Oslo with the dissertation, The Paikuli Inscription, Restoration and Interpretation.  Pt.1:  Restored Text and Translation (109 pp.).  Pt2:  Introduction and Commentary.

Chairs and Committees

Skjaervo served in a number of academic positions at Harvard including:
 Chair, Committee for Inner Asian and Altaic Studies, 1993–2000
 Chair, Department of Sanskrit, 1995–1996
 Chair, Department of Near Eastern Languages and Civilisations, 2002–2006 and 2009
He has also been invited as:
 Guest lecturer, Eötvös Loránd Tudomány University, Budapest, 1997
 Guest lecturer, Université de la Sorbonne, Paris
 Guest lecturer, Università di Studi di Roma, La Sapienza
 Visiting professor, Collège de France, Paris, May–June 2000
Skjaervo is also a Consulting Editor for Encyclopædia Iranica.

Selected books
Skjaervo has published widely in a number of languages:

English

Norwegian

References

External links
 Faculty member page, Harvard University
 Profile on the Consulting Editors page of the Encyclopædia Iranica
 Official Academia.edu
 Curriculum Vitae of Prods Oktor Skjaervo
 Complete list of publications from homepage of Prods Oktor Skjaervo
 Prods Oktor Skjaervo’s textbooks, hosted online at Harvard University, on:
 Old Avestan
 Young Avestan
 Old Persian
 Manichaean Sogdian
 Introduction to Zoroastrianism
 Introductions to Manicheism

American people of Norwegian descent
Iranologists
Harvard University faculty
Living people
1944 births
People from Steinkjer
Zoroastrian studies scholars
Linguists of Iranian languages
Linguists of Persian